Paul Jakob Deussen (7 January 1845 – 6 July 1919) was a German Indologist and professor of philosophy at University of Kiel. Strongly influenced by Arthur Schopenhauer, Deussen was a friend of Friedrich Nietzsche and Swami Vivekananda. In 1911, he founded the Schopenhauer Society (Schopenhauer-Gesellschaft). Professor Deussen was the first editor, in 1912, of the scholarly journal Schopenhauer Yearbook (Schopenhauer-Jahrbuch).

Deussen, who Sanskritised his name to "Deva-Sena" as a mark of his admiration for the language, is one of the distinguished roll of Europeans who — often with lyrical admiration — participated in the scholarly Western discovery of Sanskrit and Hinduism that took place in British India itself, Germany, France and England.

Biography
Paul Deussen was born on 7 January 1845 in Oberdreis, Neuwied in the Rhine Province, one of eight children of a clergyman of modest means. He became a student, and lifelong devotee, of the German philosopher Schopenhauer, and of the philosophy of Kant; and he became a friend of Friedrich Nietzsche. Deussen was educated at Bonn, Tübingen and Berlin Universities between 1864 and 1881, writing his dissertation on Plato's philosophy. Deussen was appointed Privatdocent (1881-7) and Extraordinarius (1887-9) at the university of Berlin, and Ordinarius (1889–1919, the year of his death), at the University of Kiel. Until 1919, Deussen continued to edit the Schopenhauer Yearbook, as well as working on an edition of  Schopenhauer's works.

It was when he attended a lecture at the University of Bonn by Professor Christian Lassen (1800-1876), expounding the Shakuntala, that Deussen was fired by Sanskrit and Hinduism. Deussen's first publication (1877) was published in English as The Elements of Metaphysics in 1894. It was followed by the translations of The Sutra of the Vedanta in 1906; The Philosophy of the Upanishads also in 1906; and The System of the Vedanta in 1912. His visit to India in 1904 was published in English as My Indian Reminiscences in 1912.  However, his autobiographical papers, edited by his daughter Erika (1894-1956) and published in German in 1922, have so far not been translated into English.

Deussen's System of the Vedanta has been reprinted several times: he uses the Brahmasutra and – rather less — Adi Shankara's commentary on it, as the structure for his exposition.

His scholarship has been described as immense, perceptive, and meticulous. Mahinder Gulati refers to him as an Orientalist and Sanskrit scholar.

Paul Deussen's name is thus linked with George Boucher, Sir William Jones and Sir John Woodroffe in British India, Anquetil-Duperron and Eugène Burnouf in France, Heinrich Roth, Franz Bopp, Friedrich von Schlegel  and Max Müller in Germany, in the European revelation of the wealth of Hinduism as revealed by Sanskrit documents.

Works 
 Die Elemente der Metaphysik (1877) - "nebst einer Vorbetrachtung über das Wesen des Idealismus" - 6. Auflage (1919)
 Das System des Vedânta. Nach den Brahma-Sûtra's des Bâdarâyana und dem Commentare des Çankara über dieselben als ein Compendium der Dogmatik des Brahmanismus vom Standpunkte des Çankara aus (1883)
 Die Sûtra's des Vedânta oder die Çariraka-Mimansa des Badarayana nebst einem vollständigen Kommentare des Çankara. Aus dem Sanskrit übersetzt (1887)
 Allgemeine Geschichte der Philosophie unter besonderer Berücksichtigung der Religionen (1894ff.):
 Band I, Teil 1: Allgemeine Einleitung und Philosophie des Veda bis auf die Upanishad's (1894)
 Band I, Teil 2: Die Philosophie der Upanishad's (1898)
 Band I, Teil 3: Die nachvedische Philosophie der Inder (1908)
 Band II, Teil 1: Die Philosophie der Griechen (1911)
 Band II, Teil 2,1: Die Philosophie der Bibel (1913)
 Band II, Teil 2,2: Die Philosophie des Mittelalters (1915)
 Band II, Teil 3: Die neuere Philosophie von Descartes bis Schopenhauer (1917)
 Sechzig Upanishad's des Veda (1897)
 Erinnerungen an Friedrich Nietzsche (1901)
 Erinnerungen an Indien (1904)
 Vedânta und Platonismus im Lichte der Kantischen Philosophie (1904)
 Outlines of Indian philosophy, with an appendix: On the philosophy of the Vedânta in its relations to Occidental metaphysics (1907)
 Vedânta, Platon und Kant (1917)
 Mein Leben (1922)

Reception
Deussen has been called an "outstanding scholar", a "great scholar" who spearheaded study of the Upanishads and Vedic literature, and as a "critical scholar".

References

External links

Vivekananda on Paul Deussen

1845 births
1919 deaths
People from Neuwied (district)
People from the Rhine Province
German Protestants
German scholars of Buddhism
German Indologists
19th-century German philosophers
German male non-fiction writers
Advaita Vedanta
Academic staff of the University of Kiel
20th-century German philosophers